Sabir Khan is an Indian sarangi player and the son of sarangi player and vocalist Padma Bhushan Ustad Sultan Khan. He belongs to the Sikar gharana school of music which has given several stalwarts to Indian classical music.

Early life
Khan was born in Jodhpur, Rajasthan to sarangi player and vocalist Padma Bhushan Ustad Sultan Khan. He trained under his father and his uncle Ustad Nasir Khan. He is the ninth generation to take up sarangi. His great-grandfather Ustad Azim Khan Sahab was a court musician at Sikar Rajasthan.

Career
Khan was exposed to music when he was six years old through his grandfather Ustad Gulab Khan.

Khan is known today for his mastery of sarangi. His technique of playing is a rare combination of sur and laya (note and rhythm).

Khan performs with his father in concert and also solo. He has performed alongside artists such as Ustad Zakir Hussain, Pt. Kumar Bose, and Pt. Anindo Chatterjee. He has also played with gazal maestro Ustad Gulam Ali, Talat Aziz, Asha Bhosle and The Hazards at a terrace gig near Citi Centre. He recently played on the album of Lata Mangeshkar.

He has played in feature films including Chameli, Rog, Dor, Anwar, Sanwariya, Chodon na yaar, Jodha Akbar, and Faisal Saif's Amma, a multilingual film.

He was part of A.R. Rehman and Shreya Ghosal's episode for MTV Unplugged.

References

Living people
Hindustani instrumentalists
Indian male classical musicians
People from Jodhpur
Sarangi players
1978 births